Merchantville is a borough in Camden County, in the U.S. state of New Jersey. As of the 2020 United States census, the borough's population was 3,820, a decrease of one person from the 2010 census count of 3,821, which in turn reflected an increase of 20 (+0.5%) from the 3,801 counted in the 2000 census.

The borough had the 22nd-highest property tax rate in New Jersey in 2020, with an equalized rate of 4.367% in 2020, compared to 3.470% in the county as a whole and a statewide average of 2.279%.

History
Merchantville was incorporated as a borough by an act of the New Jersey Legislature on March 3, 1874, from portions of Delaware Township (now Cherry Hill) and the now-defunct Stockton Township.

While one source attributes the borough's name to a family named Merchant, Francis F. Eastlack, in his History of Merchantville, tells the story of the four developers of Merchantville—Matthias Homer, John Louty, Samuel McFadden and Frederick Gerker—meeting and discussing names, when it was suggested "Gentlemen, as you are all merchants, why not call it Merchantville?"

Geography
According to the United States Census Bureau, Merchantville borough had a total area of 0.59 square miles (1.54 km2), all of which was land.

The borough borders the Camden County municipalities of Cherry Hill and Pennsauken Township.

Demographics

2010 census

The Census Bureau's 2006–2010 American Community Survey showed that (in 2010 inflation-adjusted dollars) median household income was $62,358 (with a margin of error of +/− $9,850) and the median family income was $85,909 (+/− $16,985). Males had a median income of $49,926 (+/− $36,924) versus $41,369 (+/− $15,495) for females. The per capita income for the borough was $34,308 (+/− $4,408). About 11.7% of families and 11.1% of the population were below the poverty line, including 23.7% of those under age 18 and 6.0% of those age 65 or over.

2000 census
As of the 2000 United States census there were 3,801 people, 1,524 households, and 946 families residing in the borough. The racial makeup of the borough was 85.90% White, 7.42% African American, 0.29% Native American, 2.10% Asian, 2.84% from other races, and 1.45% from two or more races. Hispanic or Latino of any race were 5.47% of the population.

There were 1,524 households, out of which 32.1% had children under the age of 18 living with them, 45.1% were married couples living together, 12.9% had a female householder with no husband present, and 37.9% were non-families. 32.0% of all households were made up of individuals, and 11.6% had someone living alone who was 65 years of age or older. The average household size was 2.48 and the average family size was 3.19.

In the borough the age distribution of the population shows 25.7% under the age of 18, 6.8% from 18 to 24, 31.5% from 25 to 44, 22.1% from 45 to 64, and 13.8% who were 65 years of age or older. The median age was 37 years. For every 100 females, there were 89.1 males. For every 100 females age 18 and over, there were 84.6 males.

The median income for a household in the borough was $49,392, and the median income for a family was $60,652. Males had a median income of $43,375 versus $30,771 for females. The per capita income for the borough was $25,589. About 5.8% of families and 6.8% of the population were below the poverty line, including 9.4% of those under age 18 and 3.0% of those age 65 or over.

Government

Local government

Merchantville is governed under the Borough form of New Jersey municipal government, one of 218 municipalities (of the 564) statewide that use this form, the most commonly used form of government in the state. The governing body is comprised of a Mayor and a Borough Council, with all positions elected at-large on a partisan basis as part of the November general election. A Mayor is elected directly by the voters to a four-year term of office. The Borough Council is comprised of six members elected to serve three-year terms on a staggered basis, with two seats coming up for election each year in a three-year cycle. 

The Borough form of government used by Merchantville is a "weak mayor / strong council" government in which council members act as the legislative body with the mayor presiding at meetings and voting only in the event of a tie. The mayor can veto ordinances subject to an override by a two-thirds majority vote of the council. The mayor makes committee and liaison assignments for council members, and most appointments are made by the mayor with the advice and consent of the council.

, the Mayor of Merchantville Borough is Democrat Edward "Ted" Brennan, whose term of office ends December 31, 2022. Members of the Borough Council are Council President Raymond H. Woods III (D, 2022), Sean H. Fitzgerald (D, 2023), Andrew O. McLoone (D, 2023), Cindy Morales (D, 2024), Anthony J. Perno III (D, 2022) and Daniel J. Sperrazza (D, 2024).

In May 2018, the Borough Council appointed Sean Fitzgerald to fill the seat expiring in December 2020 that had been held by Katherine Swann until she resigned from office. Fitzgerald served on an interim basis until the November 2018 general election when he was elected to serve the balance of the term of office.

Federal, state and county representation 
Merchantville is located in the 1st Congressional District and is part of New Jersey's 6th state legislative district. Prior to the 2011 reapportionment following the 2010 Census, Merchantville had been in the 7th state legislative district.

Politics
As of March 2011, there were a total of 2,610 registered voters in Merchantville, of which 990 (37.9%) were registered as Democrats, 489 (18.7%) were registered as Republicans and 1,129 (43.3%) were registered as Unaffiliated. There were 2 voters registered as either Libertarians or Greens.

In the 2012 presidential election, Democrat Barack Obama received 65.9% of the vote (1,190 cast), ahead of Republican Mitt Romney with 32.8% (592 votes), and other candidates with 1.4% (25 votes), among the 1,822 ballots cast by the borough's 1,970 registered voters (15 ballots were spoiled), for a turnout of 92.5%. In the 2008 presidential election, Democrat Barack Obama received 63.8% of the vote (1,274 cast), ahead of Republican John McCain, who received around 33.4% (667 votes), with 1,998 ballots cast among the borough's 2,533 registered voters, for a turnout of 78.9%. In the 2004 presidential election, Democrat John Kerry received 57.9% of the vote (1,107 ballots cast), outpolling Republican George W. Bush, who received around 37.2% (711 votes), with 1,912 ballots cast among the borough's 2,461 registered voters, for a turnout percentage of 77.7.

In the 2013 gubernatorial election, Republican Chris Christie received 55.9% of the vote (560 cast), ahead of Democrat Barbara Buono with 41.7% (418 votes), and other candidates with 2.4% (24 votes), among the 1,028 ballots cast by the borough's 2,757 registered voters (26 ballots were spoiled), for a turnout of 37.3%. In the 2009 gubernatorial election, Democrat Jon Corzine received 50.1% of the vote (637 ballots cast), ahead of both Republican Chris Christie with 42.0% (534 votes) and Independent Chris Daggett with 4.5% (57 votes), with 1,271 ballots cast among the borough's 2,609 registered voters, yielding a 48.7% turnout.

Education 
Students in public school for pre-kindergarten through eighth grade attend the Merchantville School District at Merchantville Elementary School. As of the 2018–19 school year, the district, comprised of one school, had an enrollment of 433 students and 33.5 classroom teachers (on an FTE basis), for a student–teacher ratio of 12.9:1. Students from Merchantville attend Haddon Heights Junior/Senior High School (for the high school level only) as part of a sending/receiving relationship. As of the 2018–19 school year, the high school had an enrollment of 906 students and 77.5 classroom teachers (on an FTE basis), for a student–teacher ratio of 11.7:1.

Merchantville had its own high school, Merchantville High School, until 1972, when it was shut down. At that point high school students attended Pennsauken High School in Pennsauken Township. In 1992 the borough of Merchantville made plans to switch its high school students to Haddon Heights High, but the New Jersey Commissioner of Education did not allow these plans to go forward. In 2012 the board of the Merchantville School District decided to send its students to Haddon Heights High. the Commissioner of the New Jersey Department of Education approved the proposal and beginning in September 2015 Merchantville began sending students to Haddon Heights, joining students from Barrington and Lawnside, who already attended the Haddon Heights school. Students who had already been attending Pennsauken High before the 2015 transition continued to attend the school until their graduation.

St. Peter School is a K–8 elementary school that opened in 1927 and operates under the auspices of the Roman Catholic Diocese of Camden.

Transportation

Roads and highways

No Interstate, U.S. or state highways directly serve Merchantville, though U.S. Route 130 comes closest, passing by about two blocks from the borough's west end. The most significant road passing through the borough is County Route 537.

Public transportation
NJ Transit offers bus service in the borough on the 404, and 405 and 407 routes to Camden with connecting bus and rail services into Philadelphia. Passenger rail service to Merchantville ended in the late 1960s.

Notable people

People who were born in, residents of, or otherwise closely associated with Merchantville include:

 Alfred L. Banyard (1908–1992), seventh bishop of the Episcopal Diocese of New Jersey, serving from 1955 to 1973
 Al Besselink (1923–2017), professional golfer who played on the PGA Tour in the 1950s and 1960s
 Alexander G. Cattell (1816–1894), one of Merchantville's earliest developers, he represented New Jersey in the United States Senate from 1866 to 1871
 George Arthur Crump (1871–1918), hotelier and golf course architect primarily known for designing and building Pine Valley Golf Club
 George Dempsey (1929–2017), professional basketball player who played point guard in the NBA for the Philadelphia Warriors and Syracuse Nationals
 Don Evans (1938–2003), African-American playwright, director, actor and educator
 William Joseph Fallon (born 1944), United States Navy admiral who was Commander of United States Central Command prior to retiring in 2008
 Charles G. Garrison (1849–1924), physician, lawyer, and judge who served as Associate Justice of the New Jersey Supreme Court from 1888 to 1893 and from 1896 to 1900
 Bob Greacen (born 1947), former professional basketball player who played for the Milwaukee Bucks and the New York Nets
 Burrell Ives Humphreys (born 1927), former New Jersey Superior Court judge and county prosecutor who was the lead prosecutor in the second murder trial of Rubin Carter, which resulted in Carter's conviction in December 1976
 Greg Mark (born 1967), former defensive end and linebacker who played in the NFL for the Philadelphia Eagles and Miami Dolphins
 Francis F. Patterson Jr. (1867–1935), politician who represented New Jersey's 1st congressional district in the United States House of Representatives from 1920 to 1927
 William T. Read (1878–1954), lawyer, President of the New Jersey Senate, and Treasurer of New Jersey
 Stephen H. Sholes (1911–1968), record industry executive at RCA Victor whose signings included Elvis Presley
 Albert W. Van Duzer (1917–1999), bishop of the Episcopal Diocese of New Jersey, serving from 1973 to 1982
 Ethan Van Sciver (born 1974), comics artist and social media personality
 Jersey Joe Walcott (1914–1994), world heavyweight champion boxer, actor, and Sheriff of Camden County
 Dr. Wyatt Tee Walker (1928–2018), pastor of Canaan Baptist Church in Harlem and former executive director of the Southern Christian Leadership Conference (1960–1964)Dawkins, Wayne. "A Merchantville native son who's gone far to aid others", Courier-Post, April 12, 1996. Accessed November 16, 2022, via Newspapers.com. "Wyatt Tee Walker grew up on Spruce Street in Merchantville, attended the former Merchantville High School on Centre Street and played baseball at Dunbar Athletic Club in Camden."</ref>
 Bruce A. Wallace (1905–1977), politician who served in the New Jersey Senate from 1942 to 1944 and from 1948 to 1955
 Charles A. Wolverton (1880–1969), politician who represented New Jersey's 1st congressional district in the United States House of Representatives from 1927 to 1959

References

External links

Merchantville Borough municipal website
Merchantville School District

School Data for the Merchantville School District, National Center for Education Statistics
Pennsauken High School
Merchantville Business community website

 
1874 establishments in New Jersey
Borough form of New Jersey government
Boroughs in Camden County, New Jersey
Populated places established in 1874